Kioene Arena (formerly known as Palasport San Lazzaro, PalaBernhardsson, PalaNet and PalaFabris) is an indoor sports arena located in Padua, Italy. The arena has a seating capacity of 3,916 for volleyball and is primarily used for basketball, futsal and handball. It also hosts live concerts.

The Forum is the home floor of the professional volleyball team Pallavolo Padova.

History
The arena opened in 1981. Since then, it has hosted several important sports and musical events. Among them, the 1981–82 FIBA Korać Cup final, 2007–08 UEFA Futsal Cup and 2011–12 UEFA Futsal Cup.

References

External links
PalaFabris on Pallavolopadova.com 
PalaFabris on Padovanet.it 

Basketball venues in Italy
Volleyball venues in Italy
Indoor arenas in Italy
Sports venues in Italy
Sport in Padua
Buildings and structures in Padua
Sports venues in Veneto